Erek Hansen (born August 31, 1982) is an American professional basketball player currently playing for Kolejlíler. Ranks third in career blocked shots with 212. In 2006, he had 89 blocked shots, the third best single season total at Iowa. His 83 blocked shots in 2005 ranks fourth best for a single season. He led the Big Ten in blocked shots as both a junior and senior.

Honors 

Plus Pujol Lleida

LEB Catalan League Champion: 1
2007

Iowa Hawkeyes

Big Ten Tournament Winner
2006
All-Big Ten Defensive Player of the Year
2006
Big Ten All-Defensive Team
2006

External links
Official CB Lleida website
Erek Hansen profile

1982 births
Living people
Albuquerque Thunderbirds players
American expatriate basketball people in Spain
American expatriate basketball people in Turkey
American men's basketball players
Basketball players from Texas
Centers (basketball)
Iowa Hawkeyes men's basketball players
Junior college men's basketball players in the United States
People from Bedford, Texas
Sportspeople from the Dallas–Fort Worth metroplex
TED Ankara Kolejliler players